The British Columbia Hockey League (BCHL) is a Junior A ice hockey league from British Columbia under Hockey Canada and BC Hockey.  Founded in Vernon in 1961, the BCHL now includes 18 teams.

From 1993 to 2021, the league was a member of the Canadian Junior Hockey League (CJHL), an association of Junior A leagues across Canada that would play for the National Junior A Championship. The winner of the BCHL playoffs (Fred Page Cup) would continue on to play the Alberta Junior Hockey League champion in the Doyle Cup for the right to then compete in the National Junior A Championship. In 2021, the BCHL left the CJHL.

History
In 1961, the heads of four junior "B" hockey teams in the Okanagan region of British Columbia got together and formed the first Junior "A" league in British Columbia's history. The Okanagan-Mainline Junior "A" Hockey League (OMJHL) originally consisted of the Kamloops Jr. Rockets, the Kelowna Buckaroos, the Penticton Jr. Vees, and the Vernon Jr. Canadians.

In 1967, the league expanded out of the Okanagan region, bringing in the New Westminster Royals and the Victoria Cougars of the original (1962–1967) Pacific Coast Junior Hockey League.  With the expansion, the league decided that since it was no longer solely in the Okanagan region that it need a new name, becoming the British Columbia Junior Hockey League (BCJHL).  A year later, the Vancouver Centennials joined the league.  In the 1970s, the Victoria Cougars jumped to the Western Hockey League and the New Westminster team was forced to fold due to the relocation of the Estevan Bruins into their arena.  In 1972, the Bellingham Blazers and the Nanaimo Clippers expanded the league to eight teams.

Meanwhile, in the early 1970s, the Canadian Amateur Hockey Association separated the two tiers of Junior A hockey.  The BCJHL, being a Tier II league, was then disallowed from competing for the Memorial Cup, which had traditionally been the National Junior A Championship trophy. Consequentially, the Tier II Junior A leagues across Canada agreed to compete for a new trophy called the Centennial Cup.  The 1970s also saw the rise of a rival league for the BCJHL, the Pacific Coast Junior Hockey League (PCJHL), which briefly existed in the 1960s, was resurrected by Fred Page for the 1971–72 season. Page had roots in managing junior hockey leagues, and today there are two championship trophies named for him – the Eastern Champion Junior "A" Fred Page Cup and the BCHL Championship trophy. The PCJHL was elevated to a Junior "A" league for the 1973–74 season, adjusting its name to the Pacific Junior A Hockey League (PJHL). The PJHL champion then competed with the BCJHL champion in a provincial championship, the Mowat Cup, with the winner moving on to what was the precursor to the Doyle Cup. The PJHL's Nor'Wes Caps won the 1976 Mowat Cup, while the PJHL's Richmond Sockeyes won the 1977 and 1979 Mowat Cups. Fred Page agreed to allow a merger between the PJHL and the BCJHL for the 1979–80 season.

The existence of the two Junior A leagues in British Columbia caused an unusual turn of events in the 1977–78 season postseason. The BCJHL sent their regular season champion, the Merritt Centennials, to play as the BC representative in the Pacific region (BC and Alberta) interprovincial Doyle Cup, excusing them from the BCJHL playoffs.  The BCJHL continued their league playoffs without them, crowning Nanaimo as the playoff champion after Penticton refused to finish the playoff finals due to a series of brawls in the third game of the series.  Meanwhile, the Merritt Centennials won the Doyle Cup and advanced to the Abbott Cup (the Western Canada Championship) against the winner of the ANAVET Cup, the Western region champion Prince Albert Raiders of the Saskatchewan Junior Hockey League. The Centennials lost to the Raiders, four games to one.

During the 1980–81 season, the Coastal division season was interrupted by a Ferry strike in late January.  Since the mainland teams could no longer reach the island teams, the Coastal Division stopped playing, and began extended playoff rounds in place of the regular season.

In 1986, Penticton became the BCJHL's first Junior A national champion, defeating the Metro Valley Junior Hockey League's Cole Harbour Colts by a score of 7–4 to win the Centennial Cup. A year later, the BCJHL's Richmond Sockeyes won the league's second consecutive national title.

For the 1995–96 season, the BCJHL was renamed to British Columbia Hockey League (BCHL) and changed its logo twice, in 1995 (with a logo that featured B.C. (comic strip) artwork and again in 2000.

The most notable star to come from the BCHL is Olympian and National Hockey League hall of famer Brett Hull who played for Penticton.  Hull holds the BCHL record for most goals in a season (105), which he set in 1983–84, a record that still stands today. Other NHLers who once played in the BCHL include Chuck Kobasew of the Penticton Panthers, Scott Gomez of the South Surrey Eagles, Carey Price of the Quesnel Millionaires, and Willie Mitchell of the Kelowna Spartans. In July 2013, the TheHockeyWriters.com listed the BCHL as the sixth best developmental league, professional or amateur, in North America.

The Wenatchee Wild, previously of the North American Hockey League had been attempting to get into the BCHL since 2012. On June 1, 2015, it was announced that they would be joining for the 2015–16 season, marking the league's return to the US after a twenty-year absence. The BCHL announced the Cranbrook Bucks as a 2020–21 expansion team, replacing the recently relocated Kootenay Ice of the Western Hockey League.

In March 2021, the league withdrew its membership from the Canadian Junior Hockey League (CJHL), the association of Junior A leagues across Canada that participated in the Junior A national championship each season. It had been a member of the CJHL and its predecessors since the Canadian Hockey League split from Junior A in the 1970s and BCHL/BCJHL teams had won more Junior A titles than any other league. As of April 2021, the BCHL has not withdrawn its membership from Hockey Canada or BC Hockey.

Teams

National champions
The Centennial Cup is the Junior A National Championship, also previously known under the sponsored name of Royal Bank Cup and RBC Cup, and has been captured by a BCHL team 14 times since the trophy's founding:

1986: Penticton Knights
1987: Richmond Sockeyes
1990: Vernon Lakers
1991: Vernon Lakers
1993: Kelowna Spartans
1996: Vernon Vipers
1998: South Surrey Eagles
1999: Vernon Vipers
2006: Burnaby Express
2009: Vernon Vipers
2010: Vernon Vipers
2012: Penticton Vees
2016: West Kelowna Warriors
2018: Chilliwack Chiefs

BCHL Fred Page Cup champions

Note: In the chart, league champions are bolded.

BCHL Fred Page Cup Playoffs
As of 2021, the top eight teams from each conference advance to the playoffs. The postseason consists of four rounds, all consisting of a series of best-of-seven games, with the Coastal and Interior Conference playoff champions meeting in the league finals to play for the Fred Page Cup. The team that wins the Fred Page Cup championship advances to the Doyle Cup, a best-of-seven series against the champion of the Alberta Junior Hockey League. The winner of that series moves on to represent the pacific region in the Centennial Cup, the national Junior A championship. For the 2021-22 season the BCHL dropped their association  with Canadian Junior Hockey and no longer eligible for the Doyle Cup or Centennial Cup championships.

Timeline of teams 
1961 – Okanagan-Mainline Junior Hockey League founded with Kamloops Jr. Rockets, Kelowna Buckaroos, Penticton Jr. Vees, and Vernon Jr. Canadians
1962 – Vernon Jr. Canadians become Vernon Blades
1963 – OMJHL changes name to Okanagan Junior Hockey League
1963 – Penticton Jr. Vees leave league
1964 – Penticton returns as Penticton Broncos
1964 – Kamloops Jr. Rockets become Kamloops Kraft Kings
1967 – OJHL changes name to British Columbia Junior Hockey League
1967 – Vernon Blades become Vernon Essos
1967 – Kamloops Kraft Kings become Kamloops Rockets
1967 – New Westminster Royals and Victoria Cougars join from Pacific Coast Junior A Hockey League
1969 – Vancouver Centennials join league
1970 – Chilliwack Bruins join league
1971 – New Westminster Royals and Victoria Cougars leave league
1972 – Vancouver Centennials become Vancouver Villas
1972 – Nanaimo Clippers and Bellingham Blazers join league
1973 – Kamloops Rockets move and become White Rock Centennials and then Merritt Centennials
1973 – Vancouver Villas leave league
1973 – Langley Lords join league
1973 – Vernon Essos become Vernon Vikings
1975 – Penticton Broncos become Penticton Vees
1975 – Bellingham Blazers become Maple Ridge Blazers
1976 – Kamloops Braves and Abbotsford Flyers join league
1976 – Maple Ridge Blazers become Bellingham Blazers
1976 – Chilliwack Bruins become Maple Ridge Bruins
1976 – Langley Lords become Langley Thunder
1977 – Maple Ridge Bruins move, renamed Revelstoke Bruins
1977 – Kamloops Braves become Kamloops Chiefs
1978 – Kamloops Chiefs become Kamloops Rockets
1978 – Bellingham Blazers become Bellingham Ice Hawks
1978 – Chilliwack Colts and Delta Suns join league
1979 – Penticton Vees become Penticton Knights
1979 – Revelstoke Bruins and Kamloops Rockets merge to become Revelstoke Bruins/Rockets
1979 – Richmond Sockeyes and Nor'Wes Caps join league from Pacific Junior A Hockey League
1979 – Delta Suns, Langley Thunder, and Vernon Canadians leave league
1980 – Vernon rejoins league as Vernon Lakers
1980 – Cowichan Valley Capitals and Coquitlam Comets join league
1980 – Revelstoke Bruins/Rockets change name to Revelstoke Rockets
1980 – Bellingham Ice Hawks move, renamed Vancouver Blue Hawks
1980 – Chilliwack Colts cease operations mid-season
1981 – Langley Eagles join league
1981 – Coquitlam Comets and Nor'Wes Caps cease operations
1982 – Esquimalt Buccaneers and Shuswap/Salmon Arm Totems join league
1982 – Nanaimo Clippers cease operations
1982 – Vancouver Blue Hawks move, renamed Burnaby Blue Hawks
1983 – Revelstoke Rockets renamed Revelstoke Rangers
1983 – Esquimalt Buccaneers move, renamed Nanaimo Clippers
1983 – Kelowna Buckaroos move, renamed Summerland Buckaroos
1983 – New Westminster Royals cease operations
1984 – Cowichan Valley Capitals move, renamed Sidney Capitals
1984 – Vernon Rockets renamed Vernon Lakers
1985 – Delta Flyers and Kelowna Packers join league
1985 – Burnaby Blue Hawks and Revelstoke Rangers cease operations
1985 – Merritt Centennials renamed Merritt Warriors
1985 – Abbotsford Flyers renamed Abbotsford Falcons
1985 – Salmon Arm Totems renamed Salmon Arm/Shuswap Blazers
1986 – Sidney Capitals move, renamed Juan de Fuca Whalers
1987 – Salmon Arm/Shuswap Blazers renamed Salmon Arm Tigers
1987 – Merritt Warriors renamed Merritt Centennials
1987 – Langley Eagles move, renamed Chilliwack Eagles
1988 – Summerland Buckaroos and Abbotsford Falcons cease operations
1988 – Juan de Fuca Whalers move, renamed Cowichan Valley Whalers
1988 – New Westminster Royals rejoin league
1988 – Delta Flyers move, renamed Powell River Paper Kings
1989 – Kelowna Packers renamed Kelowna Spartans
1989 – Chilliwack Eagles move, renamed Ladner Penguins
1989 – Cowichan Valley Whalers renamed Cowichan Valley Capitals
1989 – Salmon Arm Tigers cease operations
1990 – Penticton Knights renamed Penticton Panthers
1990 – Victoria Warriors join league
1990 – Ladner Penguins move, renamed Bellingham Ice Hawks
1990 – Richmond Sockeyes move, renamed Chilliwack Chiefs
1990 – Cowichan Valley Capitals cease operations
1991 – New Westminster Royals move, renamed Surrey Eagles
1993 – Cowichan Valley Capitals rejoin league
1993 – Victoria Warriors cease operations
1994 – Victoria Salsa, Langley Thunder, Royal City Outlaws join league
1995 – Bellingham Ice Hawks sell franchise rights to Trail Smoke Eaters of the Rocky Mountain Junior Hockey League; Trail joins BCHL
1995 – Vernon Lakers renamed Vernon Vipers
1995 – Kelowna Spartans cease operations
1996 – Royal City Outlaws sell franchise rights to Prince George Spruce Kings; both Prince George and the Quesnel Millionaires of the RMJHL join the BCHL
1996 – Surrey Eagles renamed South Surrey Eagles
1998 – Burnaby Bulldogs join league
1998 – Powell River Paper Kings renamed Powell River Kings; Langley Thunder renamed Langley Hornets
2001 – Coquitlam Express and Salmon Arm Silverbacks join league
2002 – Williams Lake TimberWolves join league
2002 – Burnaby Bulldogs move to Alberni Valley
2003 – South Surrey Eagles renamed Surrey Eagles
2004 – Penticton Panthers renamed Penticton Vees
2005 – Coquitlam Express move to Burnaby
2006 – Langley Hornets move, renamed Westside Warriors
2006 – Chilliwack Chiefs move to Langley
2006 – Victoria Salsa renamed Victoria Grizzlies
2007 – Williams Lake TimberWolves take leave of absence from league
2009 – Williams Lake TimberWolves active in league
2010 – Williams Lake TimberWolves declared "not in good standing"; operations suspended
2010 – Burnaby Express move to Coquitlam
2011 – Quesnel Millionaires move, become Chilliwack Chiefs
2011 – Langley Chiefs renamed Langley Rivermen
2012 – Westside Warriors renamed West Kelowna Warriors
2015 – Wenatchee Wild join league from the North American Hockey League
2020 – Cranbrook Bucks join the league as an expansion team

BCHL records
Individual records
Most goals in a season: 105, Brett Hull, Penticton, 1983–84
Most assists in a season: 111, Bob Ginetti, Burnaby, 1986–87
Most points in a season: 188, Brett Hull, Penticton, 1983–84
Most goals in a season, defenceman: 38, Campbell Blair, Vernon, 1986–87
Most assists in a season, defenceman: 77, Bruce Harris, Bellingham, 1978–79; Ian Kidd, Penticton, 1984–85
Most points in a season, defenceman: 109, Campbell Blair, Vernon, 1986–87
Most goals in a season, rookie: 84, John Newberry, Nanaimo, 1979–80
Most assists in a season, rookie: 103, Doug Berry, Kelowna, 1974–75
Most points in a season, rookie: 185, John Newberry, Nanaimo, 1979–80
Most shorthanded goals in a season: 14, Greg Hadden, New Westminster, 1988–89
Most powerplay goals in a season: 32, Dan Bousquet, Penticton, 1993–94
Longest consecutive shutout streak: 250 minutes, 25 seconds, Brad Thiessen, Prince George, 2005–06
Team records
Winning streak in a season: 42 Games Penticton Vees 2011-2012
Most wins in a season: 54 Penticton Vees, 2011–2012; 52, New Westminster Royals, 1989–90; Vernon Vipers, 1998–99
Most points in a season: 110, Penticton Vees, 2011-2012
Most goals scored in a season: 498, Penticton Knights, 1984–85
Fewest goals against in a season: 130, Penticton Knights, 48-game schedule, 1981–82; 115, Powell River Kings, 60-game schedule, 2010–11

NHL alumni
Names in bold indicate inductees of the Hockey Hall of Fame

Al Cameron
Al Hill
Alan Kerr
Alexander Kerfoot
Andrew Hammond
Andy Moog
Barry Beck
Barry Pederson
Beau Bennett
Bill Lindsay
Bill Muckalt
Blair Chapman
Bob Gassoff
Bob Hess
Bob McGill
Bob Nicholson
Bob Nystrom
Brad Bombardir
Brad Hunt
Brad Maxwell
Brad Palmer
Brandon Yip
Brendan Morrison
Brett Hull
Bruce Affleck
Bruce Cowick
Butch Deadmarsh
Byron Dafoe
Chris Jensen
Chris Murray
Cliff Ronning
Colin Greening
Craig Redmond
Curt Brackenbury
Curt Fraser
Dallas Drake
Dan Hodgson
Dan Kesa
Dane Jackson
Daryl Stanley
Dave Williams
Dave Lewis
David Jones
David Oliver
Dean Evason
Don Ashby
Don Barber
Don Murdoch
Don Nachbaur
Doug Berry
Doug Lidster
Duncan Keith
Dwight Mathiasen
Ed Beers
Eddie Johnstone
Errol Rausse
Frank Spring
Fred Berry
Garry Howatt
Gary Lupul
Gary Nylund
Gene Carr
Geoff Courtnall
Glen Metropolit
Glenn Anderson
Glenn Merkosky
Grant Mulvey
Greg Adams
Greg Adams
Greg Fox
Harold Phillipoff
Howard Walker
Ian Kidd
Jack McIlhargey
Jamie Benn
Jan Bulis
Jason Krog
Jason Marshall
Jeff Finley
Jeff Tambellini
Jerry Holland
Jim Harrison
Joe Murphy
John Craighead
John Ogrodnick
John-Paul Kelly
Justin Schultz
Ken Berry
Ken Priestlay
Kevin Maxwell
Kyle Turris
Larry Hale
Larry Melnyk
Larry Playfair
Link Gaetz
Mark Lofthouse
Mark Recchi
Mark Taylor
Matt Ellison
Matt Irwin
Matt Pettinger
Mel Bridgman
Milan Lucic
Miles Zaharko
Murray Baron
Nathan Lieuwen
Olaf Kölzig
Paul Cyr
Paul Kariya
Paul Kruse
Paul Mulvey
Paul Shmyr
Randy Rota
Ray Ferraro
Reg Kerr
Richard Kromm
Rick Lapointe
Rick Shinske
Robert Dirk
Ron Delorme
Ron Flockhart
Ron Greschner
Rudy Poeschek
Ryan Johansen
Ryan Walter
Scott Gomez
Scott Levins
Shawn Horcoff
Stan Smyl
Steve Kariya
Steve Passmore
Steve Tuttle
Tanner Glass
Tim Hunter
Tim Watters
Todd Ewen
Tom Martin
Tom McMurchy
Tony Currie
Torrie Robertson
Troy Stecher
Tyler Bozak
Tyson Barrie
Tyson Jost
Wade Campbell
Wayne Bianchin
Wayne Van Dorp
Willie Mitchell

References

External links
British Columbia Hockey League
BCHL History
BCJHL on the Internet Hockey Database

 
Ice hockey leagues in British Columbia
A
Canadian Junior Hockey League members
Sports leagues established in 1961
1961 establishments in British Columbia